is a fictional character featured in the Persona series primarily developed and published by Atlus, appearing as a main character in the 1999 role-playing video game Persona 2: Innocent Sin, in addition to its direct sequel Persona 2: Eternal Punishment (2000), both initially released for the PlayStation. Debuting as the main player protagonist in the former game, he is portrayed as a silent character whose thoughts and actions are decided by the player, whereas he appears in a supporting capacity with a defined voice and characterization in the latter entry. He is a student attending Seven Sisters High School in Sumaru City alongside his best friend Lisa "Ginko" Silverman, until they are both encouraged to investigate a mysterious phenomenon involving rumors being spread around their school coming to fruition as a result of the obscured entity known as "Joker". He along with Silverman, subsequently awakens to a power concealed within them known as the "Persona"—metaphysical deities representing his subconscious spirit, and learns to wield said power when embarking on a trip across the city to investigate the origins of the rumor phenomenon.

Tatsuya was designed by Kazuma Kaneko, lead character designer on the first three main entries in the Persona series in addition to numerous other titles in the larger Megami Tensei franchise. Kaneko commented on the character's sexuality and relationship towards another party member in Innocent Sin, Jun Kurosu, stating that his characterization and design stemmed from a desire to attract the Yaoi subculture within the Japanese fanbase, consisting of young females valuing homosexual relationships between fictional male characters. Outside of the main entries, Suou has also appeared in Persona 2: Tsumi - Lost Memories, a mobile RPG adapting Innocent Sin's narrative, as well as Persona 2: Innocent Sin ~ The Errors of Their Youth, an audio drama CD that serves as a prologue to the events of Eternal Punishment.

Tatsuya Suou's character has been positively received by critics and fans across the Persona 2 duology, with many holding his characterization and relationship arc with Jun Kurosu in particularly high regard.

Character creation 
Tatsuya Suou was designed by Kazuma Kaneko, the primary artist behind the PlayStation entries in the Persona series, as well as a recurring artist throughout the Megami Tensei franchise. The central theme behind the characters present throughout the Persona 2 duology was intended to revolve around the exploration of the human condition, and the main characters discovering their true selves. Innocent Sin's theme in particular centralized on the growth of teenagers and how they overcame hardships in life. While designing Suou and the other main characters in Innocent Sin, Kaneko emphasized the character's focus in the narrative. In order to prioritize this through the character's visual direction, Tatsuya and Lisa wore the same school uniform, while each main character was also given an item of importance to individually distinguish them. Throughout the game, Tatsuya carries a lighter, later revealed to have belonged to Jun prior to becoming Joker. Tatsuya had a characteristic habit of constantly flicking the lighter while idling, a habit he retained by purchasing a new lighter upon being transported to the Eternal Punishment timeline, since Jun and Tatsuya would've never met in that continuity and thus, he never would've received Jun's lighter as a gift during his childhood like he did previously.

Speaking on the same-sex relationship that can be initiated between Tatsuya and Jun in Innocent Sin, Kaneko stated the intention behind Tatsuya's characterization as an openly bisexual protagonist stemmed from Atlus' desire to capitalize on the growing fanbase in Japan for "yaoi" manga and anime, spearheaded by young female players who advocate for homosexual relationships between fictional male characters. The developers also expressed an interest in using Tatsuya and Jun's openly-romantic dynamic to make players question their perception towards non-heterosexuality.

Appearances

In Persona 2: Innocent Sin 
Tatsuya, an attendee of Seven Sisters High School, receives a letter from fellow student and childhood friend Lisa Silverman about a student having been kidnapped by the gang leader of rival school Kasugyama High School. Upon visiting the Sumaru City prison as directed by said gang leader, Eikichi Mishina, it is revealed that the victim was used as bait to persuade Suou to join his band he formed with his friends. Lisa provokes Eikichi into a fight between her, Tatsuya and himself, with the latter summoning his Persona, Rhadamantus, to knock both of them out, eventually causing them to awaken to their respective Personas, with Tatsuya receiving Vulcanus—the Roman God of fire. All three pass out thereafter, being summoned by Philemon, who informs them of their newfound abilities and the oncoming phenomenon regarding rumors being spread throughout their respective schools becoming reality.

The three students are joined by journalist Maya Amano and her close friend & photographer Yukino Mayuzumi. The five collectively search for the mysterious entity known as "Joker", who had contacted Suou, Silverman and Mishina upon their attempt to play the Persona game, which Yukino similarly did during her tenure as a student at St. Hermelin High. Their search for who they believe to be the source of rumors becoming reality leads them to confront Joker on multiple occasions, with the figure eventually revealing himself to be Jun Kurosu, Tatsuya's closest friend. This discovery causes the team to recall memories of their childhood, when they once partook in a play group known as the "Masked Circle", where Maya was treated as the authoritative figure, while Tatsuya, Lisa, Eikichi and Jun were all suboordinates in the games they played together. They eventually reminisce about the fateful day their shrine was set on fire by an arsonist similarly named Tatsuya Sudou, after Maya had been locked in the shrine by Lisa and Eikichi in an attempt to prevent her from leaving the playgroup and moving abroad with her father. Suou managed to awaken to his Persona then, attacking the arsonist and suffering a knife wound during the conflict, while Maya was presumed dead. In actuality, she survived as she awoke to her Persona, Maia, who gave her protection, whilst the incident would cause her to develop an extreme case of pyrophobia.

Since the incident, Jun repressed his feelings and used Joker as a platform to make other people's wishes and aspirations come true using rumors, in order to atone for his own mistakes. Realizing his manipulation under the god Nyarlathotep after being defeated by the team, he sheds his Joker form and resumes his civilian identity, reconciling with Tatsuya. Yukino then forfeits her ability to summon Personas, granting Jun her power. By then, they hear of a widely spread rumor that the former Führer of Germany, Adolf Hitler, had in fact survived World War II and amassed a secret militia of artificial Nazi soldiers known as the Last Battalion. As he prepares to invade Sumaru City, Tatsuya and his acquaintances fight off their forces in conjunction with the remaining members of the Masked Circle cult, in addition to their corrupted Shadow-selves, who came into conflict upon tempting them with their suppressed desires. Upon defeating the remnants of the Masked Circle cult, the party's Personas evolve to their ultimate forms, with Tatsuya awakening to Apollo--Greek god of the Sun.

Towards the end of their journey, Tatsuya and the team board Xibalba, an alien spaceship that materialized as a result of another rumor coming true, where they find, confront and defeat the Fuhrer. Hitler eventually reveals himself to the party as Nyarlathotep himself, who had orchestrated the preceding events of the narrative as part of a bet he made with Philemon that humanity's negatives would vastly outweigh their positives. After being defeated in his final form, he subsequently summons and orders Maya Okumura, whom had been posing as Lisa's homeroom teacher at Seven Sisters, to impale Maya Amano with the Spear of Destiny—the blade said to have pierced Jesus Christ and causes a mortal wound the second it strikes skin. Maya bids farewell to the team before passing on, surrounded by her friends, and thus fulfills the prophesied destruction of the world. Tatsuya, heartbroken, willingly relinquishes the memories he had with his friends in exchange for saving Maya's life, thus saving Sumaru City from the ongoing collapse of the world, and creating a new timeline of events where Nyarlathotep failed his mission, allowing Suou to begin anew and prosper.

In Persona 2: Eternal Punishment 
Tatsuya leads a sheltered life in the new timeline. He is revealed to have inherited the body of the Tatsuya native to this timeline while having retained all of his memories of the preceding events in Innocent Sin. Through the possession of his new body, he hopes to permanently seal Nyarlathotep away in order to atone for his inability to forget his childhood friends like he claimed he would. He investigates the new JOKER phenomenon independently of the new timeline's Maya and his brother Katsuya, insisting on staying alone in order to prevent any of his friends from regaining their memories of the previous timeline, which threatened to undo the spell Philemon cast that restored the world to its state prior to being destroyed. Despite these efforts, he is reluctantly assisted by Shiori Miyashiro, an officer at the Kounan Police Department who assists his and Katsuya's father.

Eventually, his forced partner is corrupted by JOKER, turning her into a demon-infused Shadow, who Tatsuya confronts and subsequently sedates. Taking her to the Velvet Room, he pleaded with its proprietor, Igor to restore her, intending on continuing his journey alone. Reluctantly, he accepts the help of Maya and Katsuya—both of whom have been joined subsequently in their own efforts to investigate the JOKER conspiracy by other Persona users. Though they are successful in their attempt to restore Shiori to purity, they come into conflict again with Nyarlathotep, who mocks Tatsuya for his inability to uphold his end of the promise he made to Philemon. Upon his defeat, Tatsuya finally reconciles his feelings and is presented another opportunity to return to the "Other Side". He willingly relinquishes all of the bonds he formed with his acquaintances and close friends, bidding farewell to them as he vacated the body of This Side's Tatsuya and returned to his original timeline.

In Persona 3 
In Persona 3 (2006), Tatsuya makes an off-screen cameo appearance on the in-universe talk show Who's Who?. At this point in life he is said to be in his twenties, and aspires to become a policeman like his older brother Katsuya.

Another, more indirect reference to Tatsuya is found in the game's English version through the protagonist's Social Link with his homeroom teacher, Ms. Toriumi. Toriumi is a frequent player of the in-universe MMORPG "Innocent Sin Online" (itself a reference to the game Persona 2: Innocent Sin), and converses with the protagonist exclusively through the in-game chat prior to reaching the max rank of the Social Link. The protagonist's username in the game is "tatsuya", referencing Suou, while Toriumi talks to you as "maya", referencing Maya Amano, a main character in Innocent Sin and the main playable protagonist of Eternal Punishment. In the Japanese version, Ms. Toriumi's social link instead references Digital Devil Story: Megami Tensei and its sequel, with the in-universe MMORPG being named "Devil Busters Online" (a reference to the in-universe game "Devil Busters" from Megami Tensei II) and the protagonist and Toriumi respectively using the usernames "N-Jima" and "Y-Ko" in reference to Megami Tensei's main two protagonists Akemi Nakajima and Yumiko Shirasagi.

Reception 
Tatsuya Suou has been positively received by critics and fans across his two major appearances in the Persona 2 duology. Writing for RPGFan, Neal Chandran remarked that "he fits the mute lead role quite well, as he is a private person". He further praises his characterization as being distinct from other examples of silent protagonists in the JRPG genre, exclaiming, "...unlike many angsty teens, Tatsuya is surprisingly likeable, pretty sociable, and many of his actions show strength of character". In his review of Innocent Sin's remake for PlayStation Portable, IGN's Vince Ingenito commented that Tatsuya's characterization, among the other playable characters, "creates a serious commentary on the average person's willingness to believe anything they see or hear while making teenage ennui manifest in tangibly dangerous ways", while also likening the game's overall narrative and portrayal of its characters, to an episode of the television series Buffy the Vampire Slayer (1997-2003). RPGamer.com compared Tatsuya's character and relationship with the ones from Lunar due to their dysfunctional relationships and tragic stories with Tatsuya learning through his tragedy. In restrospect, GamesRadar said that Tatsuya "captured gaming hearts" but the game did not age well to appeal to the port released several years after the original game. ScreenRant found Tatsuya's powers unique due to the idea of him being able to stop time.

Notes

References

External links

Fictional bisexual males
Fictional characters with evocation or summoning abilities
Fictional high school students
Fictional Japanese people in video games
Fictional swordfighters in video games
LGBT characters in video games
Male characters in video games
Persona characters
Sega protagonists
Teenage characters in video games
Video game characters introduced in 1999
Video game characters who have mental powers